Mogh Rahmat (also Romanized as Mogh Raḥmat; also known as Berīz, Berīzak, Bīrīzag, Bīrīzg, Bīrīzg-e Bālā, and Bozorg) is a village in Kangan Rural District, in the Central District of Jask County, Hormozgan Province, Iran. At the 2006 census, its population was 130, in 23 families.

References 

Populated places in Jask County